Viktor Schubert was a German luger who competed in the late 1930s. He won two silver medals in the men's doubles event at the European luge championships (1938, 1939).

References
FIL-Luge.org list of European luge champions  - Accessed January 31, 2008.
List of European luge champions 

German male lugers
Year of birth missing
Year of death missing
20th-century German people